Aechmutes lycoides is a species of beetle in the family Cerambycidae. It was described by Bates in 1867.

References

Rhinotragini
Beetles described in 1867